Samuel Sochukwuma Okwaraji (19 May 1964 – 12 August 1989) was a professional footballer who played internationally for Nigeria.  He was also a qualified lawyer who had a masters in international law from the Pontifical Lateran University of Rome. He collapsed and died of congestive heart failure in the 77th minute of a World Cup qualification match against Angola at the Lagos National Stadium in Surulere, Lagos State on 12 August 1989.

Career
Okwaraji was born on 19 May 1964 in Orlu, Imo State, Nigeria.

Okwaraji had a career in Europe which included playing for AS Roma (1984–1985), NK Dinamo Zagreb (1985–1986), Austria Klagenfurt (1986–1987), VfB Stuttgart (1987–1989) and SSV Ulm 1846 (loan) (1987–1988) while finishing his education in law. In his short stay with Dinamo Zagreb, Samuel scored 3 goals in a friendly game vs NK Budućnost Hodošan. The game was played on 30 April 1986, and Dinamo Zagreb won 12–0. Samuel's only official game for Dinamo in the Yugoslav First League was as a substitute on 18 May 1986 against FK Priština. The game was played at Maksimir stadium in Zagreb, the 29th round of 1985/86 season. Dinamo Zagreb won 4:3.

He was playing with Belgian side K. Berchem Sport at the time of his death.

International career
He made the Green Eagles squad in 1988 and at that year's African Nations Cup where he scored one of the fastest goals in the history of the championship against the Indomitable Lions of Cameroon. He played along until the final match, where the Eagles lost to their perennial rivals Cameroon by a lone goal. Okwaraji also made 4 appearances for the Nigerian Olympic team in 1988, one during the qualifiers, and 3 at the Olympics themselves in Nigeria's 3 games in the group D.

Last game and death
Okwaraji collapsed ten minutes from the end of a 1990 World Cup qualifier against Angola in Lagos. He died from possible complications of hypertrophic cardiomyopathy as an autopsy showed that the 25-year-old had an enlarged heart and high blood pressure.

Legacy
19 May 2019, on what would have been his 55th birthday, he was honoured with a Google Doodle.

Honours
National team
Nigeria
African Cup of Nations: 1988

See also
List of association footballers who died while playing

References

External links
 Sam Okwaraji's Bust
 Okwaraji: Thumbs down for FG, NFA

External sources
 
 Samuel Okwaraji at Playerhistory

1964 births
1989 deaths
Nigerian footballers
Nigerian expatriate footballers
Nigeria international footballers
Footballers at the 1988 Summer Olympics
Olympic footballers of Nigeria
1988 African Cup of Nations players
GNK Dinamo Zagreb players
Expatriate footballers in Yugoslavia
Yugoslav First League players
Expatriate footballers in Austria
VfB Stuttgart players
SSV Ulm 1846 players
Expatriate footballers in Germany
K. Berchem Sport players
Expatriate footballers in Belgium
Association football players who died while playing
Sport deaths in Nigeria
20th-century Nigerian people
Association football midfielders
Sportspeople from Imo State